Rosa virginiana, commonly known as the Virginia rose, common wild rose or prairie rose, is a woody perennial in the rose family native to eastern North America, where it is the most common wild rose. It is deciduous, forming a suckering shrub up to 2 metres in height, though often less. The stems are covered in numerous hooked prickles. The leaves are pinnate, usually with between 7 and 9 glossy leaflets. The pink flowers are borne singly or in small clusters and appear over a long period in midsummer. The fruits are small, round and bright red, rich in vitamin C and edible, being both used to make jams and tea. It grows in clearings, thickets, and shores. The plant attracts birds, bees, butterflies, and hummingbirds.

Charles and Bridget Quest-Ritson describe R. virginiana as "the best all-rounder among the wild roses", and draw attention to its leaf coloration in the fall: "the whole plant turns yellow, orange, scarlet, crimson and brown for weeks on end".

In cultivation, this plant has gained the Royal Horticultural Society's Award of Garden Merit.

References

virginiana
Flora of the Eastern United States
Bird food plants
Least concern flora of the United States
Taxa named by Philip Miller